André Greipel (born 16 July 1982) is a German former professional road bicycle racer, who rode professionally between 2002 and 2021. Since his retirement, Greipel now works as a directeur sportif for UCI Continental team .

Born in Rostock, East Germany, Greipel competed as a pure sprinter and took 158 wins during his professional career. His major successes included 22 stage victories at Grand Tours: 11 at the Tour de France, 4 at the Vuelta a España, and 7 at the Giro d'Italia. Greipel also won the points classification in the 2009 Vuelta a España. He also prevailed in the classic Paris–Bourges and won the overall classification of the Australian race Tour Down Under twice, in 2008 and 2010.

Professional career

T Mobile Team (2006–2010)

The 2008 Tour Down Under was to be a revelation for Greipel. He won the overall classification by a narrow margin of 7 seconds on the local Allan Davis of Team UniSA–Australia. He also earned the points classification thanks to an impressive four stage wins out of a possible six. Later in the season he won his first Grand Tour stage in the Giro d'Italia.

In the 2009 Vuelta a España, Greipel competed as the top sprinter on  benefiting from flat stages and the Columbia lead-out team. He won four stages including the prestigious last stage from group sprints. He also won the "Green Jersey" Points Classification. Greipel finished the 2009 season with an impressive 20 wins, second in victories only to his teammate Mark Cavendish.

In 2010, he started the year with his second overall victory at the Tour Down Under. He achieved that result thanks to three stage triumphs. The 4-second bonuses awarded to the winner of each stages helped him carry on to the top of the podium. In April, Greipel completely dominated the Tour of Turkey in terms of stage wins, winning 5 stages out of 8 including the opening time trial. He finished eighth overall and earned the points classification jersey. He later conquered his second Giro d'Italia stage.

Omega Pharma–Lotto/Lotto–Belisol (2011–2018)

Greipel later took the bronze medal at the World Road Race Championships in Copenhagen, after coming third in the mass sprint behind Cavendish and Matthew Goss, another former HTC teammate.

2012

At the Tour de France, Greipel and his  teammates had high hopes for stage victories. It almost happened on Stage 2, where he was edged on the line by Mark Cavendish despite having a "nearly perfect lead out train" by his own admission. On the next bunch sprint stage (Stage 4 finishing in Rouen), a crash occurred with a little less than 3 kilometers to go, which included Cavendish among other riders. Greipel steered clear of the accident and won the sprint by beating Alessandro Petacchi and Tom Veelers. Greipel repeated the feat the very next day on Stage 5, taking his second win in a row while the peloton reached the escapees in Saint-Quentin inside the final kilometer. Cavendish was part of the sprint this time around, finishing fifth. A few late attacks were reeled in during the final kilometers and he edged Peter Sagan on the line to take his third win of the Tour.

In August, Greipel took second place after winner Arnaud Démare in the Vattenfall Cyclassics, the only World Tour event disputed in Germany, his home country. He stated that the scorching heat did not help matters in the  race, and that his "engine had some cooling problems". He also announced after the race that he would not participate in the World Championships in Limburg, citing the course is not suited to his characteristics.

Greipel followed his second place with victories in the first two stages of the Danmark Rundt. In October, Greipel reacted to the Lance Armstrong–United States Anti-Doping Agency (USADA) affair: "[...] the fight against cheating and the falsely-earned successes must absolutely be continued! This fight for honesty and a fair sport has already proven itself, even if cycling's reputation seems to be continually damaged." the German wrote on his blog, supportive of the investigation.

2013
Greipel started the 2013 campaign successfully in Australia by winning the Down Under Classic and the first stage of the Tour Down Under two days later. With that victory, Greipel equaled the record for most stage wins at this race with 12, which was held by Robbie McEwen. He went on to win stages 4 and 6, establishing his own record and registering his 100th career victory in Adelaide, on the last day of the event. During Stage 3 of the Tour of Turkey, it was announced to Greipel that his grandmother had died. He talked to his family after the stage and they chose to continue. The next day, he won Stage 4, surviving a climb in the final 10 kilometers to come up a victor of a group of 38 riders. He declared after the stage: "They [his family] supported me to stay here for racing. It's also good for me. It's an important race for my build-up for the Tour de France. I promised my dad that I'd win a stage for my grandmother. I'm happy I could make it." He won another stage the next day. In late June, Greipel won the German national road race ahead of Gerald Ciolek and John Degenkolb. He was part of an eighteen-man leading group as he won the sprint on a rainy day in Wangen im Allgäu.

2014

In January, Greipel started his season with a couple of stage victories in Australia at the Tour Down Under, as has become his habit in recent years. He then went on to compete in the Tour of Oman, winning three stages and the points classification. He crashed heavily in the finale of Gent–Wevelgem with Tyler Farrar, dislocating his collarbone and tearing off the bone's ligaments. He was successfully operated upon that same evening, but that event greatly hindered his spring campaign. Greipel made his return to racing at the Tour of Turkey, where he went winless since he was still recuperating from his injuries and trying to get his form back. His next victory came on Stage 4 of the Tour of Belgium. He later participated to the Tour de Luxembourg to fine-tune his form before the Tour de France, amassing 2 stage wins in the process. On the last stage, Greipel soloed to the finish line, a rare feat for such a pure sprinter. Right before the Tour, Greipel added another win to his tally at the Ster ZLM Toer. At the Tour, success came on the sixth stage in Reims after rival fast men Arnaud Démare and Marcel Kittel had been dropped from the peloton. Greipel outsprinted Alexander Kristoff and Samuel Dumoulin to claim the first step of the podium.

2015

Greipel took his first victory of the season at the Volta ao Algarve. He then waited until the second stage of Paris–Nice to grab the next one, dedicating the victory to his mother, who he said "is going through a very hard time". In April, he was denied his third victory of the season as he was edged by 3/10,000th of a second on the finish line by Alexander Kristoff at the Three Days of De Panne. At the end of the month, he renewed with victory on the fourth stage of the Tour of Turkey. As some of his main rivals were dropped on a climb close to the finish, he won the sprint of the reduced group. His next victory was Stage 6 of the Giro d'Italia ahead of Matteo Pelucchi and Sacha Modolo. He then withdrew from the Giro ahead of stage 14. He grabbed his next success on Stage 1 of the Tour de Luxembourg.

At the Tour de France, Greipel was the victor of the second stage, a very windy affair that saw splits occur in the peloton. He was in the front group and out-sprinted Peter Sagan, Mark Cavendish and Fabian Cancellara. On the fifth stage, a bunch sprint occurred and Greipel got the better of it by besting Sagan and Cavendish. He also won the bunch sprints at the end of stages 15 in Valence and the final stage (stage 21) to Paris on the Champs-Élysées,  giving him four stage victories — the most of any competitor at that year's Tour de France.

2016
Greipel took three sprint victories on the Giro d'Italia before deciding to withdraw before the mountains. He was wearing the red jersey when he decided to quit. On 26 June, he won his third German championship in the road race, beating Max Walscheid and Marcel Kittel in a bunch sprint in Erfurt.

2017
Greipel enjoyed success in the early part of the 2017 season, taking his first win at the opening race of the Challenge Mallorca in late January before going on to take the fifth stage of Paris–Nice. At the Giro d'Italia, Greipel won the second stage: the time bonuses he collected from this and his third place on the opening stage put him in the overall race lead, earning him the pink jersey for the first time in his career. However, he subsequently suffered a victory drought: at the Tour de France, he was unable to take a stage win – the first time he did not take at least one win at a Grand Tour since the 2008 Giro d'Italia. He did not win another race until he took the honours in the inaugural edition of the Omloop Eurometropool at the end of September.

2018
Greipel started his season in January with a win on the first stage of the Tour Down Under in Lyndoch. He also took the closing sixth stage of the race, held in Adelaide. He was forced to withdraw from the spring classics after breaking his collarbone in a crash at Milan–San Remo, but returned to competition after seven weeks at the Four Days of Dunkirk, where he took another pair of stage wins, and he collected another two stages and the points jersey at the Tour of Belgium. However, he could not translate this form into a stage win at the Tour de France, and was forced to withdraw from the race after finishing outside the time limit on one of the Alpine stages. Subsequently, Lotto–Soudal announced that after eight seasons with the team, Greipel would be leaving at the end of the season.

Arkéa–Samsic (2019)
Greipel made his debut for the team at La Tropicale Amissa Bongo, where he won a stage. However, Greipel struggled to be competitive in sprints for much of the season. In October 2019 Greipel and Arkéa–Samsic announced that they had agreed to end their contract a year early, making his final appearance for the team at the Münsterland Giro. Greipel also revealed that his competitiveness was affected in the first half of the season by a bacterial disease which he suffered from for several months, recovering a fortnight before the Tour de France.

Israel Start-Up Nation (2020–2021)
In November 2019,  announced that they had signed Greipel for the 2020 season. He started his first season with the team in Australia, racing in the Tour Down Under, Race Torquay and the Cadel Evans Great Ocean Road Race, taking a best result of fourth place on stage four of the Tour Down Under before returning to Europe. However, in February 2020, Greipel suffered a shoulder fracture in a training crash near Cologne. The injury prevented Greipel from racing further before competition was suspended due to the COVID-19 pandemic.

In April 2021 Greipel stated that he would retire in 2022. The following month he took his first win in over two years at the Trofeo Alcúdia, having twice finished second in stages of the Presidential Tour of Turkey in April. He subsequently won a stage at the Vuelta a Andalucía. In July, ahead of the penultimate stage of the Tour de France, Greipel announced that he would retire from competition at the end of the season. His final race was at the Münsterland Giro, finishing tenth.

Personal life

He currently lives in Hürth, close to Cologne in Germany. After his win of the 2008 Tour Down Under, he was nicknamed the "Gorilla" by various sports media.

Career achievements

References

External links

 
 
 Strava profile

1982 births
Living people
Sportspeople from Rostock
German male cyclists
German Tour de France stage winners
German Giro d'Italia stage winners
German Vuelta a España stage winners
Presidential Cycling Tour of Turkey stage winners
Olympic cyclists of Germany
Cyclists at the 2012 Summer Olympics
German cycling road race champions
2013 Tour de France stage winners
2014 Tour de France stage winners
2012 Tour de France stage winners
2011 Tour de France stage winners
Tour de France Champs Elysées stage winners
Cyclists from Mecklenburg-Western Pomerania
People from Bezirk Rostock
Directeur sportifs